Lucius Antonius (20 BC – AD 25) was the son of Iullus Antonius (son of Mark Antony) and Claudia Marcella Major (niece of emperor Augustus).

Biography

Early life
From his mother earlier marriage to Marcus Vipsanius Agrippa he had two older attested siblings, two half-sisters named Vipsania Marcella and Vipsania Marcellina. Some epigraphic evidence suggests he had a sister named Iulla Antonia and a brother named Iullus. Around 1 BC he had probably already been betrothed to a girl of high birth.

In 2 BC his father was charged with adultery with Julia (daughter of Augustus) and was forced to commit suicide. Lucius was sent to Marseille as a result of his father's indiscretion. Lucius was described as a adulescentulus at the time, meaning that he was quite young. He was sent there under the pretence of "studying", and it was not an official exile but was in practise the same as one. Once there he studied law.

Later life
G. V. Sumner proposed that Lucius may have been a progenitor of a Junius Blaesus who was descended from Marcus Antonius.

Tacitus records his death in AD 25 at Ann. 4.44.4-5. Despite his fathers actions the senate decreed that he should be honoured with a burial at the Tomb of the Octavii, which was the tomb of his maternal grandmother Octavia Minor. This was likely done at the request of a relative (or relatives) in the imperial family, possibly his mother Marcella if she was still alive at the time.

Cultural depictions
A boy on the Ara Pacis has been identified by some to possibly be Lucius.

Notes

References

Sources
 Tacitus - The Annals of Imperial Rome
 Suetonius - The Twelve Caesars

Lucius
Julio-Claudian dynasty
Imperial Roman praetors
20 BC births
25 deaths
1st-century BC Romans
1st-century Romans